Deejay Kriel (born June 20, 1995) is a South African professional boxer who held the IBF mini-flyweight title in 2019.

Professional career

Early career
Kriel made his professional debut against Colin Tloubatla on April 10, 2014. He lost the fight on points. Kriel rebounded from this loss by amassing a 11-1-1 record, before fighting Dexter Alimento for the vacant WBC International mini-flyweight title on July 23, 2017. He won the fight by unanimous decision. He fought twice more before he challenged for a world title, with one of this fights being a WBC International title defense.

IBF mini flyweight champion
Kriel was scheduled to challenge the reigning IBF mini-flyweight champion Carlos Licona on February 16, 2019 at the Microsoft Theater in Los Angeles, California, United States. It was his first fight outside of South Africa. He came into the fight as an underdog. Despite this, Kriel won the fight by a late twelfth-round knockout. Coming into the last round, Kriel was down on two of the judges scorecards who had Licona up 108-101, while the third judge had Kriel at 105-104. Kriel managed to knock his opponent out with a left hook, with just 44 seconds left in the bout. During the post-fight interview, Kriel stated his desire to fight the WBC strawweight champion Wanheng Menayothin in a title unification fight.

Kriel was scheduled to face Jesus Fernando Aguirre in a non-title bout on November 30, 2019. He made quick work of his opponent, knocking Aguirre out in the first round. Kriel was afterwards ordered by the IBF to defend his title for a purse of $16 250. Unsatisfied with this, he opted to vacate the IBF title and move up to junior flyweight.

Move to light flyweight
Kriel was scheduled to challenge the reigning IBF junior-flyweight champion Felix Alvarado, in the latter's second title defense, on January 2, 2021 at the American Airlines Center in Dallas, Texas. Alvardo knocked Kriel down in both the second and fourth rounds, before finishing him by technical knockout in the tenth round.

Kriel faced Thembelani Nxoshe on 9 December 2022, following a 23-month long absence from the sport. He won the fight by majority decision, with scores of 78–74, 77–75 and 76–76.

Professional boxing record

See also
List of mini-flyweight boxing champions

References

External links

1995 births
Living people
Boxers from Johannesburg
South African male boxers
Mini-flyweight boxers
World mini-flyweight boxing champions
International Boxing Federation champions